Richard L. Gelfond (born July 1955) is the chief executive of IMAX Corporation. An investment banker, Gelfond and business partner Bradley Wechsler acquired IMAX Corporation in 1994, with Gelfond serving as Executive Director and Vice Chairman. In 1996, he became co-CEO, later becoming CEO in April 2009.

References 

Living people
1955 births
American chief executives
American lawyers
Stony Brook University alumni
Northwestern University Pritzker School of Law alumni